The 2013 General Cup was a professional non-ranking snooker tournament that took place between 9–13 September 2013 at the General Snooker Club in Hong Kong.

Mark Davis won his fourth professional title by defeating defending champion Neil Robertson 7–2 in the final.

Prize fund
The breakdown of prize money for this year is shown below:
 Winner: $120,000
 Runner-up: $60,000
 Semi-final: $40,000
 Per century break: $2,000
 Highest break: $20,000
 Maximum break: $367,000

Round robin stage

Group A

 Barry Hawkins 2–3 Joe Perry
 Neil Robertson 3–1 Andrew Higginson
 Joe Perry 3–1 Andrew Higginson
 Neil Robertson 1–3 Barry Hawkins
 Barry Hawkins 3–1 Andrew Higginson
 Neil Robertson 3–0 Joe Perry

Group B

 Shaun Murphy 2–3 Ricky Walden
 Ricky Walden 1–3 Mark Davis
 Shaun Murphy 2–3 Mark Davis
 Ricky Walden 1–3 Marco Fu
 Shaun Murphy 2–3 Marco Fu
 Marco Fu 3–2 Mark Davis

Knock-out stage

Notes

References

2013
2013 in snooker
2013 in Hong Kong sport